The Apostolic Nunciature to the Kingdom of Spain is an ecclesiastical office of the Catholic Church in Spain. It is a diplomatic post of the Holy See, whose representative is called the Apostolic Nuncio with the rank of an ambassador. For much of the 19th and 20th centuries the holders of the office have gone on to become cardinals with positions in the Roman Curia.

Apostolic Nuncios since 1899
Angelo Bianchi (30 September 1879 – 15 November 1887)
Mariano Rampolla del Tindaro (19 December 1882 – 2 June 1887)
Angelo Di Pietro (23 May 1887 Appointed – 28 June 1893)
Serafino Cretoni (9 May 1893 Appointed – 19 April 1900)
Giuseppe Francica-Nava de Bontifè (25 July 1896 – 7 December 1928 died)
Aristide Rinaldini (28 December 1899 – 1907 ) 
Antonio Vico (21 October 1907 – 11 February 1915) 
Francesco Ragonesi (9 February 1913 – 9 March 1926) 
Federico Tedeschini (31 March 1921 – 25 February 1938) 
Gaetano Cicognani (16 May 1938 – 7 December 1953) 
Ildebrando Antoniutti (21 October 1953 – 26 July 1963) 
Antonio Riberi (28 April 1962 – 16 December 1967 ) 
Luigi Dadaglio (8 July 1967 – 4 October 1980) 
Antonio Innocenti (4 October 1980 – 9 January 1986 ) 
Mario Tagliaferri (20 Julie 1985 – 13 July 1995) 
Lajos Kada (22 September 1995 – 1 March 2000 ) 
Manuel Monteiro de Castro (1 March 2000 – 3 July 2009)
Renzo Fratini (20 August 2009 – 4 July 2019)
Bernardito Auza (1 October 2019 – present)

References

External links 
  
  

Spain